Ponticus was a boy martyred in 177 AD during the persecution in Lyons with a group of other Christians, including Saint Pothinus and Saint Blandina. He is venerated by the Roman Catholic Church as a martyr.

References

177 deaths
Christian child saints
2nd-century Christian martyrs
Year of birth unknown